Women in the war in Donbas have taken on many different roles, both in the military and as civilians.

Women in the military 

The war has seen a significant increase in the number of women serving in the Ukrainian military, with several positions that had been reserved for men only being opened up to women. By 2016, 8,5% of the Ukrainian military were women and by March 2021, the number had risen to over 15%.

The Ukrainian Center for Drone Intelligence, which builds drones for the Ukrainian army and provides training courses for drone warfare, was founded by Maria Berlinska, who had volunteered to serve on the front after graduating from university.

A number of women soldiers have achieved high levels of public prominence during the war. Nadiya Savchenko, a fighter pilot who volunteered for the Aidar Battalion after her regular battalion was not deployed to the front, was named a Hero of Ukraine and elected to the Ukrainian Parliament after being captured by the Luhansk People's Republic.

Women have also featured in military propaganda in the war. In May 2014, Donetsk People's Republic Defence Minister Igor Girkin posted an online video calling for recruits, stating that "if men are not capable of this, we will have to call on women." In March 2015, on International Women's Day, the DNR held a propaganda beauty pageant featuring all female soldiers.

In their 2019 book Insurgent Women: Female Combatants in Civil Wars authors Darden, Henshaw and Szekely, while confirming the combat role of women in several Ukrainian and pro-Russian armed forces and militias as medics, drivers, sentries or on patrol, say that their participation in the first line of action, particularly as snipers, has been usually overstated by the media, or at least hard to verify. They distinguish female combatants by their motivation to become involved in the war. On the Ukrainian side, women were strongly moved by Ukrainian nationalism, while their pro-Russian counterpart fought for more personal reasons, like defending their families or homes. According to these authors, Ukrainian female soldiers actively chose "to go to the front. Those on the separatist side feel that the front came to them".

Discrimination 
Women in the Ukrainian military still face significant levels of discrimination and stigma, both formally, still being barred from a number of positions and with provisions like proper uniforms and maternity leave still lacking, and from their fellow soldiers. Harassment and sexual violence against female soldiers is common and rarely reported or investigated.

One female soldier recounted some of the discrimination she faced to Hromadske.TV: "I liberated 11 cities, I was involved in prisoner releases, but, nonetheless, most people would say that I am a “Carpathian, who fought in the first months of her pregnancy,” without taking my military experience into account." According to the Atlantic Council: Women served in both the Ukrainian military and volunteer battalions. In the process, they experienced sexual harassment on the frontlines and faced sexual discrimination upon their return home. Many women soldiers were criticized for leaving their children and families to serve, stereotyped as sexually promiscuous, or even investigated by social services and had their children taken away. The discrimination is often so bad that women veterans will not wear uniforms. Women are encouraged to ignore their trauma. As one female volunteer put it, “Men go to the pubs with other men, but women must get back to their jobs and take care of their children.”

In July 2021, the Ukrainian military faced criticism after it announced that women soldiers would be marching in high heels in the parade marking 30 years of independence. The Ukrainian Ministry of Defense stated that the military's 2017 dress code included high heels.

Women civilians  
Women civilians, especially in the areas where the conflict has been most intense, have faced a range of issues. The issues facing civilians in the conflict have sometimes been overlooked by the media, with journalist Alisa Sopova stating that "Some journalists who come to Ukraine in search of military action often leave disappointed, overlooking the experiences of civilians because the war is simply not dynamic or thrilling enough to follow."

Women internal refugees have faced issues, especially as they are often left alone to take care of children, along with other discrimination against refugees, such as lack of accommodations for disabilities and accusations that refugees from Donetsk harbour pro-separatist sentiments.

Roma women have faced particular levels of discrimination, often being refused internally displaced status and facing intense racism. A 2017 UN Women audit of the city of Kramatorsk found "limited or no awareness among local service providers about the needs of women with disabilities." The conflict has also seen education in some areas disrupted and the growth of patriotic youth organizations that train children in combat and survival skills.

In December 2020, the United Nations in Ukraine launched an initiative to increase the participation of women in peace processes in the country.

Human rights abuses 
Violence against women, both civilian and military, has been a significant issue in the conflict, with rates of rape and domestic abuse being widespread. In 2014, the rate of sexual violence had almost doubled compared to 2007.

In 2015 the Office of the United Nations High Commissioner for Human Rights expressed a deep concern about rapidly worsening situation with violence against women in Ukraine. A 2020 report from Amnesty International found that "gender-based violence is aggravated and intensified for those living in the conflict-affected Donetsk and Luhansk regions of eastern Ukraine," with women facing sexual harassment at military checkpoints and in detention, military and police personnel being exempt from Administrative Code provisions against domestic violence, women being discouraged from filing official reports and complaints of violence against them, and a lack of means to secure financial independence among women.

Issues of violence and discrimination against women have been exacerbated by the increase in local far-right extremist groups during the war. The COVID-19 pandemic in Ukraine has also exacerbated violence against women, with calls to domestic violence helplines increasing by 50% in the war zone in 2020.

In the city of Donetsk, a prison named "Izoliatsiia" (Isolation) was set up in a former factory and art hub and has served as a concentration camp and torture site. Three of the eight cells in the prison were reserved for women, with women prisoners often being forced to clean up the torture rooms in addition to being tortured and raped.

In July 2021, Human Rights Watch reported that several women, including one who was pregnant, had been arrested in the Donetsk People's Republic on charges of espionage and had been deprived of appropriate healthcare, stating that "the torture and other ill-treatment by armed groups is epitomized by their cruel treatment of women in custody."

Women's organisations 
A number of civil society organisations have been founded by women during the conflict, both centered on women's issues and on broader issues. Slavic Heart was founded by internally displaced women in Sviatohirsk in 2014 as a humanitarian support network.

In 2015, the Invisible Battalion was launched to advocate for gender equality in the Armed Forces of Ukraine after a study found that the majority of women who served in the war in Donbas were not enlisted officially and subsequently had no access to social or military benefits, military awards, social status, or career opportunities in the Armed Forces.

The Ukrainian Women Veteran Movement was also formed during the war to advocate for women veterans in Ukraine. During the COVID-19 pandemic in Ukraine, the group led a study on the pandemic's effects on women's veterans, with Yulia Kyrylova stating that they had "found that 14 per cent of [women veterans] have lost their jobs during the quarantine, and 53 per cent of veterans reported a significant decrease in income during that time." The Union of Participants and Veterans of the Anti-Terrorist Operation was also founded by three women, who had each participated in the Maidan protests and who had worked as truck drivers to bring military equipment to the frontlines.

In popular media 
In 2019, the short film Anna was shortlisted in the BAFTA's British Short Film category and won the Best British Short category of 2019 British Independent Film Awards.

See also  
 Women in Ukraine
 Violence against women in Ukraine
 Humanitarian situation during the war in Donbas
 Women in the 2022 Russian invasion of Ukraine

References 

War in Donbas
Donbas
Donbas